Jersey is an unincorporated community in Sumpter township which is located in Bradley County, Arkansas, United States. The ZIP Code for Jersey is 71651.

References

Unincorporated communities in Arkansas
Unincorporated communities in Bradley County, Arkansas